The 2015 international cricket season was from May 2015 to September 2015.

Season overview

Rankings
The following are the rankings at the beginning of the season.

May

2015 ICC Americas Twenty20 Division One

Points table

Final placings

England in Ireland

2015 ICC Europe Division One

Points table

Final placings

Hong Kong in Namibia

West Indies Women in Sri Lanka

New Zealand in England

Zimbabwe in Pakistan

June

United Arab Emirates in Ireland

Afghanistan in Scotland

Australia in West Indies

India in Bangladesh

Papua New Guinea in Netherlands

Pakistan in Sri Lanka

Scotland in Ireland

United Arab Emirates vs. Kenya in England

New Zealand Women in India

Nepal in Netherlands

July

South Africa in Bangladesh

2015 Pacific Games – Women's

Points table

Australia in England

2015 ICC World Twenty20 Qualifier

Final Placings

India in Zimbabwe

Australia Women in England

Nepal in Scotland

August

New Zealand in Zimbabwe

India in Sri Lanka

New Zealand in South Africa

Australia Women in Ireland

Australia in Ireland

September

2015 ICC World Cricket League Division Six

Final Placings

Scotland in Netherlands

Pakistan in Zimbabwe

Bangladesh Women in Pakistan

References

External links
 2015 season on ESPN Cricinfo

2015 in cricket